ATV Armenia (stylized as Atv) is a private television network in Armenia. The channel originally launched in April 25, 2009, replacing Armenakob TV's now-defunct frequencies.

Thematic channels 
On May 1, 2016, ATV introduced new thematic cable TV channels for different TV audiences.

Programming 
Shows that have been broadcast on ATV include:

 Sixth Sense
 Hungry Games
 More Than Life
 Half-Opened Windows
 White Corner
 Who Are They?
 Barter (Բարտեր)
 Soft Stone
 Away from Home
 Red Hill
 Stone Cage
 The Last Father
 Abel's Sister
 If I Find You
 Station

References

Television networks in Armenia
Television stations in Armenia
Armenian-language television stations